Matthew Pobjie is a Paralympic powerlifting competitor from  Australia.  He won a silver medal at the 1988 Seoul Games in the Men's Up To 100 kg event.

References

Paralympic powerlifters of Australia
Powerlifters at the 1988 Summer Paralympics
Paralympic silver medalists for Australia
Living people
Year of birth missing (living people)
Medalists at the 1988 Summer Paralympics
Paralympic medalists in powerlifting
20th-century Australian people